Forrest Allen Loudin (February 26, 1890 – September 15, 1935) was an American football, basketball, and baseball coach. He was an alumnus of the University of Iowa, where he played football. Previously he had also coached and taught science and athletics high school in Iowa.

Loudin was the head football coach at Carthage College in Carthage, Illinois for four seasons, from 1916 until 1920, compiling a record of 8–13–2.

Loudin was also professor of Mathematics and Physical Director at his time at Carthage. He died at Keokuk, Iowa in 1935 of an illness contracted during his overseas service in World War I.

References

1890 births
1935 deaths
Carthage Firebirds baseball coaches
Carthage Firebirds men's basketball coaches
Carthage Firebirds football coaches
Carthage College faculty